Tkalec is a Slovene and Croatian surname. Notable people with the surname include:

Marko Tkalec (born 1977), a retired professional tennis player from Slovenia 
Vilmos Tkálecz (1894-1950), a Hungarian-Slovene schoolmaster and politician

Places
Donji Tkalec, a village in Croatia
Gornji Tkalec, a village in Croatia
Tkalec Manor, a baroque building in Međimurje County, northern Croatia

Slovene-language surnames